Samuel F. Rogers (July 23, 1834 – November 1, 1905) was a United States Navy Quartermaster received the Medal of Honor for actions during the Korean Expedition. He was awarded the medal for his rescue of the mortally wounded Lieutenant Hugh McKee.

Rogers was born in Rawdon, Quebec in 1834 (his citation erroneously gives a different birthplace & date), as the son of Irish immigrants. He joined the US Navy in 1856, serving in the American Civil War and the Korean Expedition. He left the navy in 1883, and later worked as a lighthouse keeper.

Rogers was buried at Forest Home Cemetery, in Forest Park, Illinois.

Medal of Honor citation
Rank and organization: Quartermaster, U.S. Navy. Born: 1845, Buffalo, N.Y. Accredited to: New York. G.O. No.: 169, 8 February 1872.

Citation:

On board the U.S.S. Colorado during the attack and capture of the Korean forts, 11 June 1871. Fighting courageously at the side of Lt. McKee during this action, Rogers was wounded by the enemy.

See also
List of Medal of Honor recipients

References

1834 births
1905 deaths
United States Navy sailors
United States Navy Medal of Honor recipients
Military personnel from Buffalo, New York
Burials at Forest Home Cemetery, Chicago
Korean Expedition (1871) recipients of the Medal of Honor
Foreign-born Medal of Honor recipients
Military personnel from New York (state)
People from Lanaudière
Pre-Confederation Canadian emigrants to the United States